Cornelius Carmen "Nealy" Phelps (November 19, 1840 – February 12, 1885) was an American Major League Baseball right fielder who played for a total of five seasons, four in the National Association, and one in the National League.

He made his debut with the Fort Wayne Kekiongas of the National Association, and played in one game, at first base.  In that game, he went hitless in three official at bats, but did draw one base on balls.  The next time he appeared in the league, he played one game for the New York Mutuals in 1873.  In that game, he went hitless in six at-bats.  He made his most significant playing contribution for the Mutuals in 1874, when played in six games, and collected three hits in 24 at-bats for a .125 batting average, and scored five runs.  In 1875, he played in two games for the Mutuals, and had two hits in six at-bats, scored one run, and hit one double.  On October 12, 1875, a benefit game was played between the Mutuals against the Brooklyn Atlantics, with the proceeds going to Nealy, who also performed as time-keeper for the game.

When the Mutuals transferred their team to the National League in 1876, Phelps played in one game for them, playing in center field, and then he was loaned to the Philadelphia Athletics in a game against the Mutuals on August 10, playing catcher when they were short a player.  This was the last game he played in the Major Leagues.

Phelps died at the age of 44 in New York City, and is interred at Green-Wood Cemetery in Brooklyn.

References

External links

Major League Baseball right fielders
Baseball players from New York (state)
19th-century baseball players
Fort Wayne Kekiongas players
New York Mutuals players
Philadelphia Athletics (NL) players
1840 births
1885 deaths
Burials at Green-Wood Cemetery